The Bakuman anime series is based on the manga series of the same name, written by Tsugumi Ohba and illustrated by Takeshi Obata. The anime is directed by Ken'ichi Kasai, animated by J.C.Staff, and produced by NHK. The episodes follow Moritaka Mashiro and Akito Takagi as they attempt to create a popular manga to be made into an anime.

A 25-episode anime television series aired between October 2, 2010, and April 2, 2011, on the television network NHK. In March 2011, airing was delayed one week due to the 2011 Tōhoku earthquake and tsunami. A second season aired 25 episodes between October 1, 2011, and March 24, 2012. A third season began airing on October 6, 2012, and ended on March 30, 2013, after 25 episodes.

The first season uses three pieces of music: one opening theme and two ending themes. The opening theme is "Blue Bird" by Kobukuro. The second season also has three pieces of music: one opening theme and two ending themes. The opening theme is "Dream of Life" by Shuhei Itou. The third season has four pieces of music: two opening themes and two ending themes. Base Ball Bear. The first ending theme is "Pride on Everyday" by Sphere and the second ending theme is "Yume Sketch" by JAM Project.

The series uses also several themes for fictional anime series:
 "Chou Hero Densetsu" by Hironobu Kageyama, opening of "Super Hero Legend" (season 1);
 "Faker Trick" by Mai Kotone, opening of "Detective Trap" (season 2);
 "Crow's Sky" by Shuhei Kita, opening of "Crow" (season 2);
 "Frame in Flame" by Oldcodex, opening of "Reversi" (season 3).

Episode list

Season 1

Season 2

Season 3

References

Bakuman
Bakuman